Cynarctoides is an extinct genus of the Borophaginae subfamily of canids native to North America. They had an unusual dentition that implies an omnivorous, or possibly even herbivorous, diet.

Species
Cynarctoides acridens Barbour & Cook 1914 (syn. Cynarctus mustelinus) - Wyoming, California, New Mexico, Texas, ~20.6—16.3 Ma
Cynarctoides emryi Wang et al. 1999 - Nebraska ~20.6—16.3 Ma
Cynarctoides gawnae Wang et al. 1999 - New Mexico ~20.3—5.3 Ma
Cynarctoides harlowi Loomis 1932 - Wyoming  ~24.8—20.6 Ma
Cynarctoides lemur Cope 1879 - Oregon, South Dakota, Florida ~24.8—20.6 Ma
Cynarctoides luskensis Wang et al. 1999 - Wyoming ~24.8—20.6 M
Cynarctoides roii Macdonald 1963 - South Dakota, Nebraska ~30.8—26.3 Ma

Fossil evidence suggests that C. lemur migrated to the east and southeast over time becoming extinct in the northwest followed by the upper Great Plains and then the southeast.

References

Martin, L.D. 1989. Fossil history of the terrestrial carnivora. Pages 536 - 568 in J.L. Gittleman, editor. Carnivore Behavior, Ecology, and Evolution, Vol. 1. Comstock Publishing Associates: Ithaca.
Tedford, R.H. 1978. History of dogs and cats: A view from the fossil record. Pages 1 – 10 in Nutrition and Management of Dogs and Cats. Ralston Purina Co.: St. Louis.
Fossilworks  - Cynarctoides

Borophagines
Oligocene canids
Miocene canids
Prehistoric mammals of North America
Prehistoric carnivoran genera